An incomplete series of events which occurred in 1686 in Italy:

Events

 French attack on the Vaudois (1686) - A French attack on a Protestant community in Piedmont.

Births

 Carlo Innocenzo Carlone (died 1775) - fresco painter
 Saint Ignatius of Santhiá (Laurenzo Maurizio, 1686-1770) - diocesan priest
 Benedetto Marcello (died 1739) - composer and librettist

Deaths
 Antonio Busca, painter (b. 1625)
 Nicolas Steno, geologist and anatomist (born 1638) 
 Carlo Dolci, Italian painter (born 1616)

References